The Return is a collection of short stories by the Chilean author Roberto Bolaño, published in English in 2010, translated by Chris Andrews. This volume contains all the stories from Bolaño's two Spanish language collections, Llamadas Telefonicas (1997), and Putas Asesinas (2001), which have not been previously included in the 2006 collection Last Evenings on Earth.

The stories
 "Snow" – The son of a Chilean Communist family recalls his time as procuror for a Russian mobster.
 "Another Russian Tale"
 "William Burns" – a man from Ventura, California looks after two women who are convinced they are being stalked by a killer.
 "Detectives"
 "Cell Mates"
 "Clara"
 "Joanna Sivestri"
 "Prefiguration of Lalo Cura" – a Colombian man remembering his childhood with his mother, who was a porn actress.
 "Murdering Whores"
 "The Return" – Giles Harvey named this story, along with the title story of Last Evenings on Earth, as "the greatest things Bolaño ever wrote".
 "Buba"
 "Photos"

"Meeting with Enrique Lihn"
The narrator (Roberto Bolaño) recalls a dream about meeting the dead poet Enrique Lihn; a previous correspondence with him included a discussion of Chile's "six tigers of Chilean poetry" (including Bolaño himself) though by the time of their meeting none of the poets had achieved much, excluding Rodrigo Lira, who had committed suicide. In spite of their past correspondence Lihn does not acknowledge knowing the narrator when they are introduced, and the narrator also pretends that they are not acquainted. Later on Lihn suddenly realizes that he is dead, and the narrator leaves him. Out on the street he runs into someone he doesn't know who confuses him with someone else, and Bolaño plays along. The man soon realizes his mistake, but then proceeds to play along himself, pretending that he knows Bolaño. Both are aware of the game, and Bolaño constructs a whole story regarding the man, whom he calls Jara, and his supposed life. Bolaño returns to Lihn and they go to his surreal apartment, which seems to have a glass floor and constantly changes in structure and appearance. They eventually return to the bar where Lihn tells him that "The tigers are finished, and, It was sweet while it lasted, and, You’re not going to believe this, Bolaño, but in this neighborhood only the dead go out for a walk."

References

External links
 "Clara" – a story from the collection, published in The New Yorker, August 4, 2008.
 "Meeting with Enrique Lihn" – a story from the collection, published in The New Yorker, December 22, 2008.
 "William Burns" – a story from the collection, published in The New Yorker, February 8, 2010.
 "Prefiguration of Lalo Cura" – a story from the collection, published in The New Yorker, April 19, 2010.

2010 short story collections
Works by Roberto Bolaño
Chilean short story collections